"I Am Blessed" is a song by British girl group Eternal written by hit songwriter Mark Mueller and Marsha Malamet. It was the second single from the album Power of a Woman and peaked at number seven on the UK Singles Chart. The pop ballad spent a total of 12 weeks on the UK chart in 1995 and 1996, with three weeks in the top 10 and seven weeks in the top 20. It was certified silver by the British Phonographic Industry (BPI) for shipments over 200,000 copies in the UK. It also reached number seven in Ireland, becoming the group's second top-10 hit in that country. Eternal performed "I Am Blessed" for Pope John Paul II at the Vatican in 1995.

Critical reception
James Masterton for Dotmusic described the song as one of the group's "softer, slushier records". Pan-European magazine Music & Media wrote, "Another possible chart-buster from the creme of British R&B. The religious undertones are very suitable for the Christmas season, just like the extra track Oh Happy Day, a wonderfully updated version of the gospel traditional with a jazzy rhythm guitar and a midtempo beat." A reviewer from Music Week rated it three out of five, adding that "this silky smooth ballad has hints of I Will Always Love You, with Easther living up to Houston's standards. A hit, but not a monster."

Track listings

UK CD1 and Australian CD single
 "I Am Blessed"
 "Oh Happy Day"
 "Stay" (1995 D.A.R.C. R&B remix)
 "Faith in Love"

UK CD2
 "I Am Blessed" (Spiritual mix)
 "Faith in Love"
 "Power of a Woman" (Fathers of Sound vocal mix)

UK cassette single
 "I Am Blessed"
 "Faith in Love"

European CD single
 "I Am Blessed"
 "Oh Happy Day"
 "Power of a Woman" (Nightcrawlers mix)
 "Faith in Love"

Credits and personnel
Credits are adapted from the Power of a Woman album booklet.

Studio
 Mastered at The Master Room (London, England)

Personnel

 Mark Mueller – writing
 Marsha Malamet – writing
 Clem Clempson – guitar
 Dave Phillips – keyboards
 Peter Oxendale – keyboards
 Nick Ingman – string arrangements
 Ronnie Wilson – production
 Dennis Charles – production

 Simon Climie – additional production and remix
 Nick Hopkins – recording engineer
 Andy Bradfield – mix engineer
 Ashley Alexander – assistant engineer
 Paul Meehan – programming
 Sam Noel – technician
 Arun Chakraverty – mastering

Charts

Weekly charts

Year-end charts

Certifications

References

1995 singles
Contemporary R&B ballads
EMI Records singles
Eternal (band) songs
First Avenue Records singles
Songs written by Mark Mueller